Bródno is a neighborhood in the Warsaw borough of Targówek, located on the eastern side of the Vistula river. It is inhabited by approximately 100,000 people. Among the most notable landmarks are Bródno Park and the Bródno cemetery, the largest cemetery in Warsaw and one of the largest cemeteries in Europe.

Neighbourhoods of Targówek